Giovanni Bianconi (22 March 1891, Minusio - 7 March 1981, Minusio) was a Swiss-Italian poet, artist and ethnographer.

The son of Alessandro and Margherita Rusconi, he was the elder brother of the writer Piero Bianconi. He trained at San Gallo and the State Academy of Fine Arts Stuttgart.

Works

Lugano Cantonal Museum of Art
 Piano di Magadino, 1911-1951, woodcut on tissue paper
 Terra ticinese, 1920, woodcut on card
 Barche a riva, 1920-1980, woodcut on card
 Casupole a Minusio, 1920-1980, woodcut on card
 Lago Maggiore, 1920-1980, woodcut on card
 Nevicata, 1920-1980, woodcut on card
 Portrait of Giuseppe Zoppi aged 30, 1926, woodcut on card
 Discussione (Neutralità), 1930-1940, woodcut on card
 Vecchia Locarno, 1955, woodcut on card
 Cerimonia funebre, undated, oil on panel
 Solduno, 1946, woodcut on card

Other
 Val Verzasca, 1966
 Ticino rurale, 1971
 Legni e versi, 1978
 Costruzioni contadine ticinesi, 1982

Bibliography
Giovanni Orelli, Svizzera italiana, Editrice La Scuola, Brescia 1986, 148-150.

External links
 Woodcut self-portrait

Swiss people of Italian descent
20th-century Swiss painters
20th-century Swiss male artists
Swiss male painters
20th-century Swiss poets
20th-century Swiss male writers
Swiss ethnographers
People from Minusio
1981 deaths
1891 births